Denmark is an unincorporated community in the southwest portion of Marion Township, Owen County, in the U.S. state of Indiana. It lies near the intersection of County Road 1400 West (a.k.a. Kelly Road) and County Road 150 South (a.k.a. Denmark Road), which is a community about fifteen miles west of the city of Spencer, the county seat of Owen County.  Its elevation is 722 feet (220 m), and it is located at  (39.2697645 -87.0258445).

History
Denmark was never officially platted. The community was probably named in tribute to Denmark, in Northern Europe.

A post office was established at Denmark in 1874, and remained in operation until it was discontinued in 1906.

Geography
 West Fork Lick Creek runs souths through this community, which combines with Eel River and then flows into White River near Worthington, Indiana.
 Burger Cemetery is about four miles north of this community on Orman Road, about halfway between County Road 1250 West and County Road 1325 West, which is located at  (39.3028204 -87.0077890).
 Marion Cemetery is about three miles north of this community on County Road 1250 West, which is located at  (39.2967093 -87.0055667).
 Rea Cemetery is about two miles east of this community on County Road 150 South (a.k.a. Denmark Road), which is located at  (39.2675425 -86.9980662).
 Steubenville Cemetery, near St. Pauls Church,  is about four miles east of this community on County Road 1175 West (a.k.a. Steubenville Road), which is located at  (39.2783761 -86.9758435).

School districts
 Spencer-Owen Community Schools, including a high school.

Political districts
 State House District 46
 State Senate District 39

References

External links
 Roadside Thoughts for Denmark, Indiana

Unincorporated communities in Owen County, Indiana
Unincorporated communities in Indiana